Barleria opaca is a shrub in the botanical family Acanthaceae.

References

opaca